Enrique Ortiz de Landázuri Izarduy (born 11 August 1967), best known as Enrique Bunbury, is a Spanish singer and songwriter. He has been described as "by far the most international star of Spanish rock." He was propelled to fame as lead singer of Héroes del Silencio. After the band disbanded in 1996, Bunbury gradually developed a solo career. His "tessitura" singing style would be in the baritone range.

Career 
Bunbury got involved in music in the early 1980s, making his debut in a high school band called Apocalipsis, and later played along with Proceso Entrópico. In 1984, Bunbury joined a group called Zumo de Vidrio, debuting as a lead vocalist. After adopting the nickname of Bunbury, taken from the Oscar Wilde stage play The Importance of Being Earnest, the musician founded the band Héroes del Silencio, becoming a major number in the Hispanic rock scene.
The band eventually broke up in 1996 and Bunbury embarked on his solo career in 1997 by launching an electro-rock album, Radical Sonora with his new band: Copi (piano), Del Moran (bass), Ramon Garcias (drums) and former Héroes del Silencio guitarist Alan Boguslavsky.

Known for reinventing himself, in 1999 Bunbury released the album Pequeño (Small), which sounded very different from anything he had ever done before. His band also underwent changes, Boguslavsky was replaced by Rafa Dominguez, and new faces came on board: Ana Belén Estaje (violin), Luis Miguel Romero (percussion), Javier Iñigo, Javier Garcia Vega & Antonio Ríos in the metal instruments.

This band was known as the "Huracán Ambulante" ("Wandering Hurricane") they had great energy on stage and performed with tremendous gusto. In 2005 after 8 years together, Bunbury dissolved the band due to a series of events that caused Bunbury to feel frustrated with the record label and his future. Bunbury took a trip to disconnect and clear his thoughts by spending some time in Cuba. After some time he connected with Spanish singer songwriter Nacho Vegas. They agreed to record a new album titled "El Tiempo De Las Cerezas". The album was released in 2006 with a small tour. This led to the release of a live DVD performance at The Gran Teatre del Liceu in Barcelona.

In 2007, Héroes del Silencio agreed to take part in an exclusive worldwide tour consisting of ten concerts to be given in ten cities around the world, which bore the name "Tour 2007" and marked the 20th anniversary of their first performances and the ten years that had elapsed since their dissolution as a band in 1996. The first concert took place in Guatemala City on 15 September, followed by Buenos Aires (21 September), Monterrey, Mexico (25 September), Los Angeles (28 September), Mexico City (4 & 6 October), Zaragoza, Spain (10 & 12 October), Seville, Spain (20 October) and Valencia, Spain (27 October), which wrapped up the '07 Tour.

Bunbury went on to ensemble a new band which goes by the name "Los Santos Inocentes" (The Holy Innocents). Bunbury has recorded eight studio albums with Los Santos Inocentes. Helville De Luxe (2008), Las Consecuencias (2010), Licenciado Cantinas (2011), Palosanto (2013), MTV Unplugged: El Libro De Las Mutaciones (2015), Expectativas (2017), Posible (2020), and Curso De Levitación Intensivo (2020).

Unlike Héroes del Silencio, Bunbury's solo career has been very different in terms of musical sound but managed to keep the essence of rock, while experimenting with various rhythms from electronic music and Middle Eastern sounds in the early stages of his solo career to cabaret music, rancheras, blues, flamenco and tango, or to salsa, milonga, boleros and cumbia in one of his latest works which pays tribute to Latin America. According to La Banda Elastica, "Rock gods do exist... and Enrique Bunbury is definitely one of them." He is renowned for his powerful, operatic voice which can range from F2-A5 with the ability to hit C3. Bunbury is a baritone. The SESAC Latina Music Awards honoured him with the Icon Award in 2019.

A documentary directed by Alexis Morante was released in 2016 entitled El camino más largo (The Longest Way), which chronicles the 2010 tour Bunbury did of the United States.

He is a vegan.

On February 28, 2022 Bunbury through his social media announced his final tour and retirement from the stages, this is due to health issues, mainly respiratory that the singer had to get through for a long time.

Despite the tour was meant to end in September, on May 10 Bunbury announced that due to an unexpected worsening of his health, he would have to cancel the rest of the tour, and retire earlier.

Discography

Studio albums

Live albums

Awards and nominations

Latin Grammy Awards

Note: Two other songs performed by Bunbury but not written by him have been nominated for the Latin Grammy Award for Best Rock Song, "Gozilla" with Leiva and Ximena Sariñana in 2019 and "El Sur" with Love of Lesbian in 2021, both nominations went to the songwriters of each song; Leiva for the former and Santi Balmes & Julián Saldarriaga for the latter.

MTV Europe Music Awards

References

Further reading
Pep Blay Enrique Bunbury. Lo demás es silencio. Barcelona, 2007, Plaza & Janés. 448 pages, Spanish. .

External links
Enrique Bunbury Official Web Site
Official pages on social media sites

1967 births
Alternative rock guitarists
Alternative rock singers
Living people
People from Zaragoza
Rock en Español musicians
Spanish rock singers
Singers from Aragon
Spanish male singers
Capitol Latin artists
Latin music songwriters
Rock songwriters
MTV Europe Music Award winners
Latin Grammy Award winners